Fred Finn may refer to:

 Fred Finn (musician) (1919–1986), Irish folk musician
 Fred Finn (politician), American politician and member of the Washington House of Representatives
 Fred E. Finn, founder of the Mickie Finn's nightclub